L number may refer to:
List of British weapon L numbers, an identification code used for British Army weapons
L-number, a classification code used to identify catfish
Azimuthal quantum number, symbolized as ℓ (lowercase script L)